Glaucopsyche melanops, the black-eyed blue, is a butterfly of the family Lycaenidae. It is found in the western part of Southern Europe and North Africa.

The length of the forewings is 11–13 mm. The butterfly flies from May to July depending on the location.

The larvae feed on Fabaceae species.

Description from Seitz

L. melanops Bdv. (= saportae Hbn.) (82 h). Above similar to the smallest varieties of cyllarus, but the ocelli of the forewing beneath are enlarged, usually much more than in our figure; the row, moreover, is strongly curved and the ocelli gradually increase in size from the first to the fifth, the sixth ocellus, if present, being smaller again. In South- West Europe, ab. elongata Courv. (= marchandii Gerh.) has elongate ocelli; ab. marchandii Bdv. is beneath without ocelli. — In North Africa there occurs a considerably larger form with broader black margin to the forewing and somewhat darker underside; this is algirica Ruhl-Heyne. — Larva pale green, with thin dark markings; a brownish dorsal stripe and a white side-line, between which a dark green pencilling; head black. Until June on Dorycynium. Pupa pale brown, with black dots on the sides. In spring, usually frequent wherever it occurs.

References

External links
Butterflies of Europe

melanops
Butterflies described in 1828
Butterflies of Europe
Taxa named by Jean Baptiste Boisduval